Carlos Fernando Asprilla Mosquera (born 19 October 1970) is a Colombian football player who started his professional career with Independiente Medellín.

Club career
One of Colombia's best defensive players during the mid-late 1990s, he also played for América de Cali.

Personal life
He's a cousin of former Colombian player Faustino Asprilla. He has three kids, first son Christopher Asprilla born in April, whom currently lives in Spain. Carlo's Second oldest daughter, Valentina Asprilla, her birthday is on May 8, 1997, she lives in The United States with her mother—Carlos's first Wife. youngest daughter Sara Sofia Asprilla, whom lives in Cali Colombia with Carlo's second wife.

External links

1970 births
Living people
Colombian footballers
Colombian expatriate footballers
Colombia international footballers
América de Cali footballers
Unión Magdalena footballers
Unión de Santa Fe footballers
Independiente Medellín footballers
Deportivo Cali footballers
Atlético Junior footballers
Millonarios F.C. players
Atlético Bucaramanga footballers
C.S. Herediano footballers
S.D. Aucas footballers
Atlético Balboa footballers
Deportes La Serena footballers
C.D. Juventud Independiente players
C.S.D. Municipal players
Categoría Primera A players
Chilean Primera División players
1997 Copa América players
2000 CONCACAF Gold Cup players
Expatriate footballers in Costa Rica
Expatriate footballers in Ecuador
Expatriate footballers in Chile
Expatriate footballers in El Salvador
Expatriate footballers in Guatemala
Colombian expatriate sportspeople in Chile
Association football defenders